USS Michigan (SSBN-727/SSGN-727) is an  nuclear-powered guided missile submarine (SSGN), converted from a ballistic missile submarine (SSBN), that is part of the United States Navy. She is the third vessel to bear the name of the U.S. state of Michigan.

Construction and commissioning
Michigan was constructed at the Electric Boat Division of General Dynamics Corporation in Groton, Connecticut, and was commissioned on 11 September 1982. Michigan arrived in Bangor, Washington, on 16 March 1983 and completed sixty-six Strategic Deterrent Patrols. She was originally designed and commissioned as a ballistic missile submarine (SSBN) capable of deploying  24 Trident II submarine-launched ballistic missiles (SLBM) with nuclear warheads.

Conversion to SSGN 

As of June 2007, Michigan has been converted to an SSGN at the Puget Sound Naval Shipyard. Her hull classification symbol then changed from SSBN-727 to SSGN-727.

Post-conversion 

On 12 December 2009, Michigan returned to Naval Base Kitsap, her home base, completing her first deployment after the SSGN conversion.  The deployment began 10 November 2008, and included numerous missions. The boat also completed several theater security cooperation engagements with Pacific Rim nations.

On 28 June 2010, Michigan was one of three Ohio-class submarines involved in a US response to Chinese missile testing in the contested East China Sea. Michigan, and  all surfaced simultaneously in the waters of South Korea, the Philippines, and the British Indian Ocean Territory respectively.

In August 2016, Chief Petty Officer Dominique Saavedra became the first enlisted female sailor to earn her submarine qualification, and was assigned to Michigan. (The first female, both officer and overall was in 2011.)

On 25 April 2017, Michigan docked at Busan Naval Base, South Korea, during a time of heightened tensions with North Korea. She later joined the USS Carl Vinson Carrier Strike Group in the Sea of Japan for exercises. Photographs show a dry deck shelter mounted on Michigan.

References 

This article includes information collected from the Naval Vessel Register and various news articles.

External links 

 

Ships built in Groton, Connecticut
Ohio-class submarines
Cold War submarines of the United States
Nuclear submarines of the United States Navy
Ballistic missile submarines
1980 ships
Submarines of the United States